Banksia tridentata, commonly known as yellow honeypot, is a low-growing shrub that is endemic to the southwest of Western Australia. It has narrow egg-shaped leaves with a sharp point on the tip, greenish yellow flowers in heads of between 85 and 125, and elliptical to egg-shaped follicles.

Description
There is a small sharp point on the tip and sometimes two or three small teeth near the tip of the leaf.

Taxonomy
This species was first formally described in 1856 by Carl Meissner who gave it the name Dryandra tridentata and published the description in Hooker's Journal of Botany and Kew Garden Miscellany.

In 1893 Benjamin Daydon Jackson accidentally listed it in Index Kewensis under Banksia, thus unwittingly publishing the name Banksia tridentata. This is now the current name for the species, as in 2007 all Dryandra species were transferred to Banksia by Austin Mast and Kevin Thiele.

Distribution and habitat
Banksia tridentata grows in kwongan between the Arrowsmith and Hill Rivers.

Ecology
An assessment of the potential impact of climate change on this species found that its range is unlikely to contract and may actually grow, depending on how effectively it migrates into newly habitable areas.

Conservation status
This banksia is classified as "not threatened" by the Western Australian Government Department of Parks and Wildlife.

References

 

tridentata
Plants described in 1855
Taxa named by Carl Meissner